Larry Edward André Jr. (born 1961) is an American diplomat and career member of the Senior Foreign Service who has served as the United States Ambassador to Somalia since February 2022. He previously served as the United States Ambassador to Djibouti from 2018 to 2021, and as the United States Ambassador to Mauritania from 2014 to 2017.

Early life and education
André earned a Master of Business Administration from Thunderbird School of Global Management of Arizona State University and a Bachelor of Arts from Claremont McKenna College.

Career
André is a career member of the Senior Foreign Service, with the rank of Minister-Counselor. He served as the United States Chargé d’Affaires ad interim at U.S. Embassy in Juba, South Sudan. He is a former Ambassador to Djibouti and Mauritania. He has served as Director of the Office of the Special Envoy for Sudan and South Sudan, and as Deputy Executive Director in the State Department’s Bureau of African Affairs, and was the Deputy Chief of Mission at the U.S. Embassy in Dar es Salaam, Tanzania.

André has served as a diplomat since 1990. He is a two-time Deputy Chief of Mission with appointments to nine American missions abroad, mostly in Africa. He has also held senior policy positions at the United States Department of State.

Ambassador to Somalia
On April 15, 2021, President Joe Biden nominated André to be the next United States Ambassador to Somalia. The Senate Foreign Relations Committee held hearings on his nomination on June 9, 2021. The committee reported him favorably to the Senate floor on June 24, 2021. On December 18, 2021, the United States Senate confirmed his nomination by voice vote. On January 29, 2022, he presented a copy of his credentials to Minister of Foreign Affairs Abdisaid Muse Ali. On February 7, 2022, he presented his credentials to President Mohamed Abdullahi Mohamed.

Awards and recognitions
He is the recipient of numerous State Department Awards, including the Director General Award for Reporting, and was recently recognized by the Chairman of the Joint Chiefs of Staff with the Joint Distinguished Civilian Award.

Personal life
Andre speaks French.

References

External links
 Biography at U.S. Department of State

1961 births
Living people
Obama administration personnel
Trump administration personnel
Biden administration personnel
Ambassadors of the United States to Mauritania
Ambassadors of the United States to Djibouti
Ambassadors of the United States to Somalia
Claremont McKenna College alumni
Thunderbird School of Global Management alumni
United States Foreign Service personnel
21st-century American diplomats